The Pantax pistol (Spanish: Pistola Pantax) was a semi-automatic pistol manufactured by Fabrica E. Woerther of Buenos Aires, Argentina. The design is based on the Austrian Frommer Stop.

Overview
The Pantax pistol is a .22LR calibre semi-automatic pistol using a simple blowback operation and notably has an underbarrel design.

See also
List of pistols

Underbarrel pistols
FN M1900
Jieffeco Model 1911

References

.22 LR pistols